This is a list of the 124 resident embassies in Madrid. For other diplomatic missions in Spain, see List of diplomatic missions in Spain.

Embassies in Madrid

Consulates-general in Madrid

Other delegations, missions in Madrid

Honorary consulates in Madrid

Official Residences

See also 
 Foreign relations of Spain
 List of diplomatic missions in Spain

References 

 
Spain
Diplomatic missions
Madrid-related lists